Kerk-Avezaath is a village in the Dutch province of Gelderland. It is a part of the municipality of Buren, and lies about 3 km west of Tiel.

A small part of the village (not counted in the statistics above) is part of the municipality of Tiel, and consists of about 60 houses.

History 
It was first mentioned in 850 as Auansati, and means "church at the house of Avo (person)". The village developed along two parallel roads on a stream, and a stretched esdorp developed. The tower of the Dutch Reformed Church dates from 1640 and has an 11th century base. The church dates from 1861 and has 14th century elements. In 1840, it was home to 449 people.

Gallery

References

Populated places in Gelderland
Buren
Tiel